Procolpochelys is an extinct genus of sea turtle from the Miocene of what is now Maryland, Virginia, and New Jersey. Its fossils have been found in the Calvert Formation. It was first named by Hay in 1908.

References

External links
 Procolpochelys at the Paleobiology Database
 www.scistp.org

Cryptodira
Fossils of the United States
Miocene turtles
Prehistoric turtle genera
Taxa named by Oliver Perry Hay
Extinct turtles